Mary Batdorf Scotvold is an American figure skating coach, best known for her work with Olympic medalists Paul Wylie and Nancy Kerrigan, whom she co-coached with her husband, Evy Scotvold.

She won the novice ladies title at the 1959 U.S. Figure Skating Championships.  She later skated with Ice Follies and was married to former U.S. pair champion Ronald Ludington, for a time.  In the mid-1970s, after separating from Ludington, she began coaching at the Wagon Wheel rink in Rockton, Illinois, where her pupils included a young Scott Hamilton.  It was there that she teamed up with Evy Scotvold.  They coached in Janesville, Wisconsin for a time before relocating to the Boston area in 1986.  They are now semi-retired  and coaching part-time in Jacksonville, Florida.

In addition to Wylie and Kerrigan, the Scotvolds also coached 2000 World Junior champion Jennifer Kirk.  Mary was known primarily as the choreographer on the team rather than as a technical coach.

Mary's twin sister Anne Batdorf Militano is also a skating coach and former competitive skater.

Results

References
 Scott Hamilton, Landing It.  .
 "Slowing down in southland", The Augusta Chronicle, December 1, 2005.

American figure skating coaches
Living people
Female sports coaches
Year of birth missing (living people)
American twins